Thaali Pudhusu is a 1997 Indian Tamil-language drama film, directed by K. R., starring Ramki, Suresh and Khushbu. It was released on 10 April 1997. The film is a remake of the Telugu film Aame (1994).

Plot
Arun falls in love at first sight with a bank cashier Seetha. Arun begins to follow her everywhere. Seetha refuses his love and tells him her past.

In the past, Seetha was from a middle-class family. Seetha's brother-in-law was a jobless son-in-law and lived with them. Balu was a bank manager and falls in love with Seetha. Mani, Balu's father, a miser, looked for a rich daughter-in-law. Finally, Balu married Seetha and the same day, Balu died in a crossfire. So Mani refused to keep Seetha in his house. Later, without money, Mani begged Seetha to come with him and she took her late husband job. Seetha's brother-in-law took his wife's thaali and tied the thaali to Seetha. She immediately removed the thaali.

Arun decides to marry her despite her past. The court cancels the marriage between Seetha and her brother-in-law. Seetha's sister beats her husband in the spinal cord to save Seetha's marriage. In the end, Arun and Seetha get married.

Cast

Ramki as Arun
Suresh as Balu
Khushbu as Seetha
Rajesh as Seetha's father
Thalaivasal Vijay as Seetha's brother-in-law
Manivannan as Mani, Balu's father
Senthil as 'Leg' Dada
Vennira Aadai Moorthy as a marriage broker
Sangeetha as Lakshmi, Seetha's mother
Kalaranjini as Kala, Seetha's sister
Pandu
Madhan Bob
R. S. Shivaji
Ennatha Kannaiya
Omakuchi Narasimhan
Sudha as Balu's father
Manager Cheena
Varna
Sriji
Natarajan
Karuppu Subbiah
Vellai Subbaiah
Pasi Narayanan
Marthandan
MLA Thangaraj
Chelladurai

Soundtrack 

The film score and the soundtrack were composed by Vidyasagar and Raj. The soundtrack, released in 1997, features 2 tracks with lyrics written by Vasan. The critic give a negative review and he described the tracks as atrocious.

Reception
A critic from hindu.com cited : "there is really nothing new" but praised the comedy tracks.

References

External links

1997 films
Tamil remakes of Telugu films
1990s Tamil-language films
Films scored by Vidyasagar
Indian drama films
Films directed by Keyaar
1997 drama films